Makarba is a census town in Ahmedabad district in the Indian state of Gujarat.

Demographics
 India census, Makarba had a population of 18,090. Males constitute 53% of the population and females 47%. Makarba has an average literacy rate of 60%, higher than the national average of 59.5%: male literacy is 69%, and female literacy is 51%. In Makarba, 16% of the population is under 6 years of age.

References

Cities and towns in Ahmedabad district
Neighbourhoods in Ahmedabad